Paul Gagnon may refer to:

 Paul Gagnon (politician) (born 1937), member of the House of Commons of Canada
 Paul A. Gagnon (1925–2005), historian and educator
 Paul M. Gagnon, American attorney

See also
 Paul-Edmond Gagnon (1909–1981), member of the House of Commons of Canada